Finger coral may refer to:

 Acropora humilis (Dana, 1846) in the family Acroporidae
 Montipora digitata Pallas 1766 in the family Acroporidae
 Porites compressa Pallas 1766 in the family Poritidae
 Porites porites Pallas 1766 in the family Poritidae
 species of the genus Seriatopora 

Animal common name disambiguation pages